John Thomas Watson Bacot (1821–1888) was a New Zealand politician in the Auckland Region.

Biography
Bacot arrived in New Zealand in June 1848 to take up a position as Medical Officer to the Pensioner Settlements, having previously served as an Assistant Surveyor in the British army in India. He retired to England in 1858.

He was a member of New Zealand's 1st Parliament, representing the Pensioner Settlements from 1853 to 1855, when he was defeated.

The Pensioner Settlements electorate consisted of the Auckland suburbs of Howick, Onehunga, Ōtāhuhu, and Panmure.

References

1821 births
1888 deaths
New Zealand MPs for Auckland electorates
Members of the New Zealand House of Representatives
Unsuccessful candidates in the 1855 New Zealand general election
19th-century New Zealand politicians